Rheban  is a Gaelic Athletic Association (GAA) club based in southwest County Kildare, Ireland, near Kilberry. Twice winners of the Club of the year in 1996-1997, they competed in the senior championship in the 1940s, reaching the semi-final in 1945, and after winning the Junior and Intermediate championships in successive years in 1996-7. The club takes its name from nearby Rheban Castle.

Honours
 Kildare Intermediate Football Championship: (3) 1942, 1970, 1997
 Kildare Junior Football Championship: (3) 1940, 1969, 1996
 Jack Higgins Cup (2) 1969, 1996
 Kildare Senior Football League Division 3: (1) 1996
 Kildare Senior Football League Division 4: (1) 1984
 Dowling Cup (1) 2008
 The Leinster Leader Junior Club Cup (4) 1995, 1998, 2002, 2007
 Kildare Junior D Football League  (1) 1996
 Kildare Under-21 C Football Championship (1) 2014
 Kildare Under-21 B Football Championship (1) 1999
 Kildare Minor B Football Championship (1) 1996
 Kildare Under-16 A Football Championship (1) 1997
 Kildare Under-16 B Football Championship (1) 1995
 Kildare Under-16 C Football Championship (1) 2012
 Kildare Under-16 B Football League  (1) 1995
 Kildare Under-16 Div. 2 Football League (1) 2013
 Kildare Minor Football League Div. 4 (1) 2013
 Kildare Ladies Football Junior C Championship (1) 2013
 Kildare Club of the Year (3) 1969, 1996, 1997

Bibliography
 Kildare GAA: A Centenary History, by Eoghan Corry, CLG Chill Dara, 1984,  hb  pb
 Kildare GAA yearbook, 1972, 1974, 1978, 1979, 1980 and 2000- in sequence especially the Millennium yearbook of 2000
 Soaring Sliothars: Centenary of Kildare Camogie 1904-2004 by Joan O'Flynn Kildare County Camogie Board.

External links
Facebook page
Kildare GAA site
Kildare GAA club sites
Kildare on Hoganstand.com

Gaelic games clubs in County Kildare
Gaelic football clubs in County Kildare